Cuthbert Cowan (1835 – 4 April 1927) was a 19th-century Member of Parliament from Southland, New Zealand.

Biography

Political career

He unsuccessfully contested the  electorate in both the 1896 general election and the  against Joseph Ward.

Death
He died on 4 April 1927 in Invercargill aged 92.

References

1835 births
1927 deaths
Members of the New Zealand House of Representatives
New Zealand MPs for South Island electorates
Unsuccessful candidates in the 1896 New Zealand general election
19th-century New Zealand politicians